James D. Rolfe (born July 10, 1980) is an American YouTuber, filmmaker, and actor. He is best known for creating and starring in the comedic retrogaming web series The Angry Video Game Nerd (2004–present). His spin-off projects include reviews of other retro films, television series, and board games. He is considered a pioneer of internet gaming videos, and is noted for widespread influence on YouTube content after his series premiered on the site in 2006.

Rolfe began creating homemade video productions in the late 1980s, having created more than 270 videos and short films throughout his career. Among these were the first Angry Video Game Nerd episodes, released on his website in 2004. Two years later, Rolfe gained mainstream attention after the series went viral upon being published on YouTube. In the interim, he filmed videos he created on his own and most of them have been released on his website, Cinemassacre.

Early life
Rolfe was born in Philadelphia, Pennsylvania on July 10, 1980. He was raised in south New Jersey. His parents bought him an audio recorder as a Christmas present sometime in the early to mid-1980s. Later, he got a camera and took photographs of him and his friends play fighting. He was inspired by The Legend of Zelda and Teenage Mutant Ninja Turtles to create adventure stories. Rolfe also illustrated comic books, which he updated monthly. One such comic he created had a plot inspired by the video game The Legend of Zelda: A Link to the Past.

Rolfe started filming shorts in 1989  continuing this hobby into the mid 1990s. He used Mario Paint for a few of his early films. He eventually took classes for hand-drawn animation at a university. His early films did not have scripts or rehearsal. However, once he started writing scripts, his friends gradually lost interest because of the pressure of trying to remember their lines, which left many of Rolfe's films unfinished. He then tried his hand at action figures and puppets. The plot of The Giant Movie Director (1994) involved toys coming to life. Rolfe attended a  special education school for seven-and-a-half years during his childhood. He reflected on his past, "In school, I had a rough time communicating. I went to special ed for seven-and-a-half years. I liked it, I had a good time. But socializing in general... I was a little awkward. Art always made me feel comfortable."

Rolfe attended the University of the Arts and has a bachelor's degree in fine arts.

Since his early teen years, Rolfe operated and ran an annual "haunted house" Halloween attraction out of his parents' garage (the same garage was later used in building a graveyard for his horror comedy film The Deader, the Better and again used in his film/series pilot Jersey Odysseys: Legend of the Blue Hole), using a collection of several props and antiques that he later reused multiple times in his other films.

Career

Early films
In May 1996, he filmed A Night of Total Terror in his backyard, a horror film that he has called "the turning point of [his] life". In the late 1990s, Rolfe created several films such as the B-horror movie The Head Incident that he finished in 1999 but did not release until its tenth anniversary in 2009. He also made Cinemaphobia in 2001, which follows an actor who suffers from an overload of work and sees hallucinations of cameras following him. Two versions of the film were made, a ten-minute version and an extended, fifteen-minute version. Rolfe has stated his preference for the shorter ten-minute version. The same year, he created Kung Fu Werewolf from Outer Space which is a mainly silent movie except for narration. He also created an hour-long comedy film entitled Stoney, which is a spoof of the 1976 film Rocky. His eighth film of 2001 was It Came from the Toilet!. In 2003, he created another film, Curse of the Cat Lover's Grave, which was split into three parts to define three different horror genres. Rolfe made a pilot of a planned web series entitled Jersey Odysseys: Legend of the Blue Hole, which is based on the urban legends of the state of New Jersey. The pilot centers around on the legend of the Jersey Devil.

Later, in 2004, he got a job editing industrial training videos, which he quit in early 2007.

In May 2007, he began a new web series called You Know What's Bullshit?, in which he rants about everyday pet peeves; such as pennies, shoelaces, pay toilets, and printers. Originally just being rants by Rolfe, he instead decided to create a new character to host the series named "The Bullshit Man" (which is just Rolfe wearing a mask resembling cow dung). The Bullshit Man made several cameo appearances in AVGN content, including select videos and the video game AVGN Adventures as a secret character. In 2020, the show's name was abbreviated to You Know What's BS? due to YouTube's advertising policies.

In 2007, Rolfe began filming The Deader, the Better, a classic-style B-movie horror film that pays homage to the 1968 horror film Night of the Living Dead. The film was shown at the Atlanta Horror Fest in October 2007. On May 5, 2006, Rolfe released a music video that included stock footage from a trip he had made to England and Scotland. The music used in his work was from the Black Sabbath single "Heaven and Hell". Rolfe also participated in the 48 Hour Film Project between 2004 and 2007. In the 2007 event, he was the Audience Award Winner for his film Spaghetti Western. His other entries were a trilogy of films called Death Suit (2004), Death Seen (2005) and Death Secret (2006).

Angry Video Game Nerd

Rolfe's career did not gain much momentum until May 2004, when he filmed a 5-minute short review of the Nintendo Entertainment System (NES) game Castlevania II: Simon's Quest under the name "Bad NES Games". His character was originally named "The Angry Nintendo Nerd" but was changed to "The Angry Video Game Nerd" (sometimes shortened to "The Nerd") to avoid trademark issues and because he started reviewing games on other consoles (e.g. Sega Genesis, Atari 2600). Rolfe conceived of the character while studying at the University of the Arts of Philadelphia when he attended from 1999 to 2004. Rolfe then made another video, a review of the 1988 game Dr. Jekyll and Mr. Hyde, originally intended as the last of the series due to it being the game Rolfe hated most. The video introduced the running joke of The Nerd drinking alcohol due to the badness of a game; Rolfe initially used Rolling Rock for the gag as it was the only beer in his refrigerator at the time, but would later perform the joke with Yuengling beer, hard-liquor, or non-alcoholic hot sauce. Rolfe originally intended to keep his videos private, but his friend and collaborator, Mike Matei, convinced him to post the videos to a YouTube channel called "JamesNintendoNerd" (now called Cinemassacre) on April 6, 2006, which Matei created and managed for him.

On September 12, 2006, Rolfe's character first gained mainstream attention when his review of Teenage Mutant Ninja Turtles became popular on YouTube. His videos were also posted on GameTrailers and ScrewAttack and had gained 30 million views monthly. He has over 3 million subscribers, as of September 2019. At the end of 2007, Rolfe halted the production of the series and cancelled an appearance at MAGFest after suffering from a break in his voice. On March 17, 2010, he made the announcement that he was suffering from burnout as a result of consistently writing, directing and starring in the videos, and that the show would be entering a brief hiatus. It was scheduled to return in May 2010; however, an episode was released on April 30. Episodes are released on either the first or second Wednesday of each month, as opposed to two episodes per month due to Rolfe's other projects. Episodes were at one point posted on YouTube over a year after their original release on GameTrailers. Rolfe formerly had affiliations with ScrewAttack before leaving in 2013.

Rolfe's Nerd character gained further fame through a fictional feud with fellow YouTuber Doug Walker's Nostalgia Critic character. This began with the Critic launching a satirical attack in an early video, prompting a response from the Nerd. The feud took place over several videos between 2008 and 2009, culminating in a crossover video entitled "TGWTG Team Brawl" wherein the characters fight and ultimately reconcile. Out of character, Rolfe and Walker clarified that the feud was entirely fictional and that they were in fact good friends; both have since collaborated on a number of videos and other projects.

Angry Video Game Nerd: The Movie
For a period, Rolfe focused his efforts on producing Angry Video Game Nerd: The Movie, which revolves around E.T. the Extra-Terrestrial, the video game for the Atari 2600. The film was a collaboration between Rolfe and Kevin Finn and was entirely funded by fan donations. The release of the film in 2014 coincided with the 31st anniversary of the 1983 video game crash. The final sequence of the movie, in which The Nerd reviews E.T., was later released as a standard AVGN episode.

Other films

Rolfe had a cameo in a Doritos and Pepsi commercial published online in November 2010. The ad was part of a voting contest of which the winning clip was to be shown during Super Bowl XLV. However, the ad was eventually withdrawn due to public backlash, because it parodied the Catholic practice of Eucharist. In 2007, Rolfe had a cameo in the fan film Return of the Ghostbusters. He was featured in the 2009 documentary His Name Was Jason, in which he talks about the Friday the 13th movie series and its antagonist Jason Voorhees. Similarly, Rolfe appeared in a bonus feature to the 2010 documentary Never Sleep Again: The Elm Street Legacy, in which he discusses the Nightmare on Elm Street NES game, a title he had previously covered as the Nerd in the 13th AVGN episode. The bonus feature can be found on the second disc of the Never Sleep Again DVD set.

In 2010, it was announced that Rolfe was set to feature in a low-budget remake of Plan 9 from Outer Space entitled Plan 9, which was released through Video on Demand beginning February 16, 2016, and then released on physical media in stores on January 5, 2017. Around early to mid January 2013, Rolfe played a brief role as a news reporter in an independent short film about Sonic the Hedgehog. He was offered a role in V/H/S/2 by Adam Wingard, but had to decline due to working on Angry Video Game Nerd: The Movie. He was later offered a potential cameo in Godzilla vs. Kong by Wingard, but the demands of production, alongside the timing of the birth of Rolfe's second daughter, made the arrangement unfeasible. Rolfe also appeared in the crowdfunded 1980's horror documentary In Search of Darkness.

Commitment to the YouTube videos has slowed Rolfe's progress in making new features, but he did make a trilogy of new shorts after Angry Video Game Nerd: The Movie, including Dr. Jekyll and Mr. Hyde: The Movie (2015), based on the video game, Flying Fuckernauts vs. The Astro-Bastards (2016), a tribute to B-movie sci-fi, and Mimal the Elf (2017), a mockumentary. On May 25, 2017, in a general update video about the future of the YouTube channel, Rolfe announced he was in very early development on what he termed an "atmospheric horror movie... [the film would] take place in one room... very minimal". On December 29, Rolfe announced that 2018 would lean more toward his own original projects, and that he had begun writing the untitled horror film. It would be in the vein of past projects, such as Legend of the Blue Hole and Cinemaphobia. On August 8, 2018, Rolfe said he was 50-75% done with the script, and that it would contain some type of 'nostalgia theming', but it would likely undergo further rewrites and had no plans to film it in the near future. On June 19, 2019, Rolfe said the script was completed, but commitment to video production would delay the project for the foreseeable future.

On October 18, 2020, Rolfe announced the horror film was postponed indefinitely due to time constraints. Instead, he directed a sequel to his 1999 horror short, The Head Incident, reuniting several members of the original cast/crew. On June 10, 2021, Rolfe released a video, explaining the premise of the shelved 'nostalgic' horror film: It would be about a man revisiting a childhood amusement park, only to become trapped there. Rolfe stated that the project could be revived in another medium, and that he was working on another small-scale screenplay.

Other video series
Cinemassacre has published a number of other reviews featuring Rolfe and associates as themselves. The topics include video games (under the James & Mike Mondays series), video game peripherals such as the VictorMaxx Stuntmaster headset, and films. One of Rolfe's other series is Board James, where he, Brendan "Bootsy" Castner and Mike Matei review old board games in a humorous way, often with recurring characters. This show eventually developed into a psychological horror series, while still containing board game reviews in each episode. The show ran for 3 seasons and 27 episodes before ending in 2015.

Rolfe was involved in a fifteen-part series titled OverAnalyzers, where he played the part of the manager of a fictional company that over analyzed various pop culture references. The series was edited and produced by another website called Cinevore. He also worked as a film reviewer on Spike.com.

Rolfe has run Monster Madness, in which he reviews one horror movie for each day in October, since 2007. Each year, he has adopted a different theme for Monster Madness. 2007 was the history of horror. 2008 was Godzillathon, in which he reviewed all of the Godzilla films chronologically. 2009 was Monster Madness Three, which dealt with a variety of popular and little known films of horror. 2010 was Camp Cult, which dealt with both campy horror films as well as cult classic films, such as Troll 2. 2011 was Sequel-A-Thon, which dealt with horror sequels. And 2012 was 80's-a-Thon, which included only movies made in the 1980s. While the first five years of Monster Madness have been one film review per day for the entirety of the month of October 2012's 80's-a-Thon series of Monster Madness was reduced to every other day of October due to the production of The Angry Video Game Nerd Movie. Despite the decreased number of film reviews, the film reviews in 80's-a-Thon were longer than previous reviews on Monster Madness. With October 2013's Sequel-A-Thon 2, Monster Madness has returned to one review per day. 2013 was Sequel-A-Thon 2, which dealt with more horror sequels. The previous 31 marathon Monster Madness series ran during October 2016. Rolfe expressed his desire to move onto other Halloween-themed projects and reviews in the future, but said that Monster Madness will always live on in some way.

In 2017, Son of Monster Madness debuted, which consisted simply of five new reviews, with the rest of October bulked by reuploads of older reviews previously not available on YouTube.  Monster Madness, under the original branding despite not having videos posted everyday, returned in October 2019, now having Rolfe with a guest talk about the films. Rolfe brought back Monster Madness in 2021 with the aid of Screenwave Media. However, Rolfe redacted the first two published videos of the 2021 series after realizing that his writer had plagiarized contents of the episodes' scripts.

In 2012, Rolfe and Mike Matei created a Let's Play series called James and Mike Mondays, formerly called James and Mike Plays, for Cinemassacre's YouTube channel. The series featured guests such as Kyle Justin, who composed the Angry Video Game Nerd theme song, Brandon Castner, better known as Bad Luck Bootsy from Board James, JonTron and Macaulay Culkin. Rolfe and Matei produced episodes for eight consecutive years until they announced the series would be on hiatus until February 2021. However, Matei left Cinemassacre in December 2020 to become a full-time streamer on Twitch.

On May 16, 2016, Rolfe uploaded a video to Cinemassacre's YouTube channel in which he expressed unhappiness with the 2016 Ghostbusters reboot film and how he planned on not seeing it or releasing a review. Rolfe criticized the film's lack of originality but had no problem with the female cast. This stance was criticized by some in the entertainment industry, with many theorizing that a significant portion of fan backlash against the movie was being grounded in sexism. Actor Patton Oswalt, who criticized Rolfe, pulled back his accusation later, claiming to have "picked the wrong target". Rolfe had no ill feelings towards Oswalt and admitted in an interview with Double Toasted in 2021 that he did not even think what he said was intended to be bad.

Personal life

Rolfe attended the University of the Arts in Philadelphia from 1999 to 2004 and continued living there after graduation. He briefly relocated to Los Angeles while filming Angry Video Game Nerd: The Movie (2014) but returned to Philadelphia upon completion of the movie.

In 2004, Rolfe was involved in a car crash when a utility trailer came loose from its truck, flung out to the other part of the highway, and hit him head-on. Rolfe sustained no physical injuries from the crash, while his Saturn Ion, which he had bought just nine days prior, was wrecked. Later that year, Rolfe discussed his experience in a short movie, Mechanical Losses.

Rolfe met April Chmura in July 2004; she was a cinematographer on the early Nerd episodes. They began dating shortly after and got married in November 2007. He announced at the premiere trailer for Angry Video Game Nerd: The Movie in November 2012, that they were expecting their first child. In April 2013, she gave birth to a baby girl. Rolfe has not divulged details about his daughter except for a few photos and expressing thanks that his wife got past complications resulting during childbirth.

In November 2013, April posted an update on Rolfe's Cinemassacre website that their daughter is continually seeking medical treatment due to unspecified complications. On April 13, 2016, Rolfe revealed what happened while announcing an auction of various Cinemassacre memorabilia to benefit Shriners Hospitals for Children. During birth, his daughter suffered nerve damage in one of her arms, and required many months of physical therapy to gain full use of it. Rolfe expressed gratitude to Shriners for all they did for his family during that time.

Rolfe's second daughter was born on September 1, 2017.

He is of Italian ancestry.

Rolfe had a pet cat named Boo who occasionally appeared on the Angry Video Game Nerd. Boo died of cancer on April 27, 2020.

Rolfe published his autobiography, A Movie Making Nerd, in 2022.

Filmography

Film

Television / Webshows

References

External links

1980 births
American film critics
American autobiographers
American male film actors
American male television actors
American male voice actors
American podcasters
American television directors
American television writers
American humorists
American YouTubers
21st-century American comedians
Cinemassacre
Living people
Male actors from New Jersey
American male television writers
Gaming YouTubers
People from Penns Grove, New Jersey
University of the Arts (Philadelphia) alumni
Video game critics
American writers of Italian descent
Screenwriters from New Jersey
21st-century American screenwriters
YouTube critics and reviewers
YouTube podcasters
21st-century American male writers
Film directors from New Jersey
People from Philadelphia
Winslow Township High School alumni
Television producers from New Jersey
American people of Italian descent
YouTube channels launched in 2006